The Wilbur Cross Parkway (also known locally as "The Merritt" in conjunction with its counterpart) is a limited access road in Connecticut, comprising the portion of Route 15 between Milford and Meriden. It is named after Wilbur Lucius Cross, a former governor of the state (1931–1939).

Commercial vehicles, trailers, towed vehicles (except as provided in Connecticut state law Section 14.298.240), buses, hearses, and large vehicles are prohibited from using the parkway. The Wilbur Cross Parkway had two toll barriers located in Milford and Wallingford until 1988, which now serve as service plazas.

Route description 

The four-lane Wilbur Cross Parkway begins as a direct continuation of the Merritt Parkway at the Sikorsky Bridge over the Housatonic River at the town line between Milford and Stratford. Immediately after is the exit for the Milford Parkway, which connects to the Connecticut Turnpike (I-95) and the Boston Post Road (US 1). The Wilbur Cross Parkway runs northeast through the towns of Milford, Orange, Woodbridge, and New Haven. At the town line between New Haven and Hamden, the parkway passes through the West Rock Tunnel, which was renamed "Heroes Tunnel" in 2003 by the State of Connecticut to honor first responders. The only road tunnel through a natural obstacle in New England, it is lighted solely using low pressure sodium vapor lamps, rare in the United States. The parkway proceeds north through the towns of Hamden, North Haven, Wallingford, and Meriden. After connecting with I-91 in Meriden, the parkway ends, merging onto North Broad Street (US 5). North of Meriden, Routes 5 and 15 continue as the Berlin Turnpike.

Reflecting its history as a toll road, two pairs of service plazas lie opposite one-another along the parkway in Orange and North Haven. All were renovated since 2011, along with  six further south on the Merritt Parkway. In addition to gas pumps and an Alltown convenience store at each plaza, they now include Dunkin' Donuts and Subway shops. Prior to the renovations, no fast-food service had been available at any of the plazas. Three abandoned rest areas remain along the Parkway, in Woodbridge, New Haven, and Meriden.

History 
The Wilbur Cross Parkway was originally planned in 1937 as route from US 1 in Milford to the Massachusetts state line in Union. The portion of the parkway south of Meriden was built largely as planned. Construction began in 1939 when federal funds were secured. The first section of the parkway to open was the Milford to Orange segment, from the Housatonic River (Exit 54) to Route 34 (Exit 57-58) at the end of 1941. Subsequent construction was delayed by World War II.  After the war, two more sections of the parkway opened: the segment from US 5 in Wallingford (Exit 66) to US 5 in Meriden (Exit 68), bypassing the city center opened in 1946; and the segment from Route 10A in Hamden (Exit 61) to US 5 in Wallingford opened in 1947.

In 1948, the parkway was designated as part of a new Route 15, connecting New York to Massachusetts. Because the New Haven segment had not yet been completed, motorists were directed to temporarily follow Route 34, US 5, and Route 10A. In November 1949, the New Haven segment, from Exit 57-58 to Exit 61, including the West Rock Tunnel opened. The entire parkway was a toll road when it opened in 1941. Tolls were removed from both the Merritt and Wilbur Cross Parkways in 1988.

Exit list
Mileposts and exit numbers listed below continue from the Merritt Parkway.

References

External links 
 Connecticut state highway route log, 2006
 kurumi.com – Wilbur Cross Parkway
 nycroads.com – Wilbur Cross Parkway

State highways in Connecticut
Parkways in the United States
Transportation in New Haven County, Connecticut
Freeways in the United States
Former toll roads in Connecticut